Labugama pearsoni is a species of spine-headed katydid found in Sri Lanka. It is the only species in the genus Labugama.

References

Conocephalinae
Orthoptera of Asia
Insects described in 1932